The Gonow GX6 is a mid-size crossover SUV (mid-size SUV produced since 2014 by the Chinese manufacturer Guangzhou Automobile under the Gonow brand. It was based on the lower market Gonow Aoosed GX5.

Overview

The Gonow GX6 was previewed by the Gonow GA6470 Concept that debuted on the 2014 Beijing Auto Show in April 2014. The Gonow GX6 production version is powered by a Mistsubishi-sourced 2.4 liter engine mated to a 5-speed manual gearbox. The price of the Aoosed G5 ranges from 86,800 yuan to 148,800 yuan. 

The design of the Gonow GX6 is controversial as the front fascia heavily resembles the Land Rover Evoque and was referred to as a poor impersonation of Range Rover. The rest of the design was based on the structures of the Gonow Aoosed GX5 while featuring an optional two tone paint job. The price of the GX6 ranges from 109,800 yuan ($17,900) to 146,800 yuan ($26,053).

References

External links 

GX6
Mid-size sport utility vehicles
Crossover sport utility vehicles
All-wheel-drive vehicles
2010s cars
Cars introduced in 2014
Cars of China